Gumrah: End of Innocence is an Indian crime television series that started airing from March 2012 on Channel V India. The show presents crime related incidents committed by young people. The series was produced by Ekta Kapoor under her banner Balaji Telefilms

The show went on air on Channel V India on 11 March 2012 airing weekly with rebroadcasts on Channel V India, Star Plus. The second season, it began broadcasting daily.  Season 3 started airing from 7 July 2013. The opening episode was co-anchored by Chitrangada Singh and Karan Kundra. Season 4 was hosted by Abhay Deol who was replaced by Karanvir Bohra. Season 5 started on 22 March 2015, Last episode was aired on 26 June 2016.

Plot
The show explores and suggests the right measures to avert crimes, narrating real-life stories revolving around harassment, kidnapping, murders, etc. committed by teenagers.

Series overview

Cast
 Ashish Dixit as Neeraj 
 Karan Kundra as Host
 Abhay Deol as Host
 Karanvir Bohra as Host
 Ritwika Gupta as Payal
 Rachana Parulkar as Kanak Dagar
 Rocky Verma as Father / Village's Subedar (1 Episode - 2013)
 Kurush Deboo as Porous Batliwala (1 Episode - 2012)
Shabaaz Abdullah Badi as Rishi in Season 5 Episode 25 (2015)
 Teeshay Shah (2 Episodes 2014–2015)
 Sakshma Srivastav as Taani & Megha (2 Episodes, Season 3 Episode 6 & Season 4.
 Karan Patel as Current Host (March 2015 - June 2016)
 Mohak Meet From (2012 to 2015)
 Ayush Mamodia On (6 May 2012)
 Jigyasa Singh
 Namita Dubey as Shreya
 Amitayushya Mishra as Shridhar (Episode 4, Season 3)
 Jaswinder Gardner
 Ashi Singh on (season 5 2015)
 Raj Anadkat as Romi
Nabeel Ahmed Mirajkar as Manav, Rishab and Dhruv (3 episodes)

Accolades
 The show won Best Crime/Thriller Show at 12th Indian Television Academy Awards.
 The show was nominated as Favorite TV Crime Drama People's Choice Awards India.
 The show has secured 10 nominations at the Indian Telly Awards 2013

References

External links
 
 Official Page for Season 1 on BalajiTelefilms.com
 Official Page for Season 2 on BalajiTelefilms.com
 Official Page for Season 4 on BalajiTelefilms.com

Balaji Telefilms television series
Channel V India original programming
Indian drama television series
Indian crime television series
Indian anthology television series
Indian teen drama television series
Indian legal television series
2012 Indian television series debuts
2016 Indian television series endings
Works about sexual harassment